Wook Talk is a South Korean talk show hosted by Lee Dong-wook alongside comedian Jang Do-yeon and announcer . It aired on Wednesdays at 22:00 (KST) time slot on SBS TV from December 4, 2019 to February 26, 2020. It was later replaced by K-Trot in Town on March 4, 2020.

Cast
 Lee Dong-wook as host
 Jang Do-yeon as MC
  as talk analyst

Production

Background
On November 2, 2019, Lee Dong-wook announced at the end of his fanmeeting that he would be hosting his own talk show. The following day, his agency King Kong by Starship officially confirmed the news. The decision was made after his hosting skills were recognized in Strong Heart (2012–2013) and to celebrate his 20th anniversary since debut.

Live music
The show is not aired live but is instead filmed in front of a live audience. The live soundtrack for the show is provided by the band .

Shortened title
Following recurring remarks by netizens on the show's title being too long, SBS launched a poll on its website on December 18, 2019 with six different options for a shortened version of the title. The poll ran for 10 days, until December 28, and netizens could vote once a day. "Wook Talk" won with 87% of the votes.

Episodes

Ratings
In the table below,  represent the lowest ratings and  represent the highest ratings.

References

External links
  

2019 South Korean television series debuts
2020 South Korean television series endings
South Korean television talk shows
Korean-language television shows